KTPL may refer to:

KTPL, a Christian radio station broadcasting in Colorado Springs, Colorado, USA
King Township Public Library, a public library system in King, Ontario, Canada
Draughon-Miller Central Texas Regional Airport, an airport in Temple, Texas, USA with ICAO designation KTPL